Sinsamut Klinmee (born October 30, 1995) is a Thai Muay Thai, Kickboxer and Bare knuckle boxer who competes in the lightweight division of ONE Championship.

Early life 
Klinmee born in Pattaya, Thailand, his family ran a gym. Along with running the gym, his family was a major force on the Thailand Circuit, producing champions in revered stadiums such as Lumpinee and Rajadamnern. Klinmee start training from the age of 4, but he started to take it more seriously under the tutelage of his father and him brother, Sudsakorn Sor Klinmee a few years later. His first fight when he was 7.

At age of 21, Klinmee was drafted into the Thai armed forces. After He won multiple fights, the army sent him to join the national boxing camp. In 2019 after winning a national boxing title at Lumpinee Stadium in Bangkok, Klinmee got the chance to fight at the International Military Sports Council competition.

Career

BKFC Thailand 
Klinmee defeated Jonny Tello by decision at BKFC Thailand 1 on December 18, 2021.

ONE Championship 

Sinsamut replaced Islam Murtazaev for a short notice fight at ONE: X on March 26, 2022 against former Glory Welterweight Champion Nieky Holzken, initially in kickboxing, the fight was changed to Muay Thai rules.
He won the fight by a second-round knockout.

Klinmee was expected to face Islam Murtazaev at ONE 159 on July 22, 2022. Murtazaev later withdrew because of a "family emergency" and was replaced by Liam Nolan. Klinmee won the fight by a five-second knockout in the second round.

Klinmee faced Regian Eersel for the inaugural ONE Lightweight Muay Thai World Championship at ONE on Prime Video 3 on October 22, 2022. He lost the fight by split decision.

The rematch between Sinsamut and Eersel took place on March 17, 2023, at ONE Friday Fights 9. He lost the bout via knockout in the fourth round.

ONE Openweight Muay Thai World Grand Prix
On January 22, 2023, Sinsamut was announced as one of the 16 participants in the $1 million dollars ONE Openweight Muay Thai World Grand Prix Tournament.

Fight record 

|- style="background:#fbb;"
| 2023-03-17|| Loss||align=left| Regian Eersel || ONE Friday Fights 9 || Bangkok, Thailand ||  KO (Left hook to the body) || 4 ||1:17
|-
! style=background:white colspan=9 |

|- style="background:#fbb;"
| 2022-10-22|| Loss ||align=left| Regian Eersel || ONE on Prime Video 3 || Kuala Lumpur, Malaysia || Decision (Split) || 5 || 3:00
|-
! style=background:white colspan=9 |

|-  style="background:#cfc;"
| 2022-07-22 || Win ||align=left| Liam Nolan || ONE 159: De Ridder vs. Bigdash || Kallang, Singapore || KO (Left hook) || 2 || 0:05

|- style="background:#cfc;"
| 2022-03-26|| Win ||align=left| Nieky Holzken || ONE Championship: X || Kallang, Singapore || KO (Punch) || 2 || 1:39

|- align="center"  bgcolor="#cfc"
| 2021-04-10 || Win ||align=left| Coleman Maher || Muay Hardcore || Bangkok, Thailand || KO (Left hook) || 1 ||

|- align="center"  bgcolor="#cfc"
| 2019-10-31 || Win ||align=left| Yuri Soares || Muay Hardcore || Bangkok, Thailand || Decision || 3 || 3:00

|- align="center"  bgcolor="#cfc"
| 2019-07-21 || Win ||align=left| Islam Murtazaev || Muaythai Night 5 || Moscow, Russia || Decision (Split) || 5 || 3:00

|- align="center"  bgcolor="#cfc"
| 2019-04-07 || Win ||align=left| Yang Qiubin || Muay Thai Super Champ || Bangkok, Thailand || KO (Straight to the body) || 2 || 2:10

|- style="background:#fbb;"
| 2018-04-08|| Loss ||align=left| Gaetan Dambo || Duel 3 || Paris, France || KO (Knee to the body) || 2 ||

|- align="center"  bgcolor="#cfc"
| 2017-12-08 || Win ||align=left| Bashkim Selmani || Muay Xtreme || Bangkok, Thailand || Decision || 3 || 3:00

|- align="center"  bgcolor="#cfc"
| 2017-09-07 || Win ||align=left|  Miguel Aaraya || Samui Fight|| Ko Samui, Thailand || KO (Right cross)|| 1 ||

|- style="background:#fbb;"
| 2016-04-30|| Loss ||align=left| Anouar Khamlali ||  Fighting Spirit, Final || Rome, Italy || KO (Elbows)|| 3 ||

|- style="background:#cfc"
| 2016-04-30|| Win ||align=left| Martin Meoni ||  Fighting Spirit, Semi-final || Rome, Italy || Decision || 3 ||3:00

|- style="background:#cfc"
| 2016-02-28|| Win ||align=left| Magomed MuaythaiAcademy|| SUPER MUAYTHAI || Bangkok, Thailand || KO (High kick)|| 2 ||

|- align="center"  bgcolor="#cfc"
| 2016-01-24|| Win ||align=left| Bilada Oguzhan || Max Muay Thai || Pattaya, Thailand || KO (High kick)|| 1 ||

|- align="center"  bgcolor="#cfc"
| 2015-11-29 || Win ||align=left| Anes Lakhmari || Max Muay Thai || Pattaya, Thailand || TKO || 2 ||

|- align="center"  bgcolor="#cfc"
| 2015-10-25|| Win ||align=left| Anes Lakhmari || Max Muay Thai || Pattaya, Thailand || Decision || 3 || 3:00

|- align="center"  bgcolor="#cfc"
| 2015-07-26 || Win ||align=left| Umut Norgaz || Max Muay Thai || Pattaya, Thailand || Decision || 3 || 3:00

|- align="center"  bgcolor="#cfc"
| 2015-06-21 || Win ||align=left| Gligor Stojanov || Max Muay Thai || Pattaya, Thailand || Decision || 3 || 3:00

|- align="center"  bgcolor="#cfc"
| 2015-03-15 || Win ||align=left| James Benal || Max Muay Thai || Pattaya, Thailand || Decision || 3 || 3:00

|- style="background:#fbb;"
| 2014-02-22|| Loss ||align=left| Jack Cooper || THAI FIGHT Hua Hin || Hua Hin, Thailand || Decision || 3 || 3:00

|- align="center"  bgcolor="#cfc"
| 2014-01-03 || Win ||align=left| Sudeam Kauanjai ||  Muay Thai Combat Mania	 || Pattaya, Thailand || Decision || 3 || 3:00

|- align="center"  bgcolor="#cfc"
| 2013-11-15 || Win ||align=left| Kom Kop Petchrungruang ||  Muay Thai Combat Mania	 || Pattaya, Thailand || Decision || 3 || 3:00
|-
| colspan=9 | Legend:

Bare knuckle record 

|-
|Win
|align=center|1–0
|Jonny Tello
|Decision
|BKFC Thailand 1
|
|align=center|5
|align=center|2:00
|Pattaya, Thailand
|
|-

See also 
 List of current ONE fighters
 List of ONE bonus award recipients
 2022 in ONE Championship
 ONE on Prime Video 3
 ONE 159
 ONE: X

References

External links 
 Official ONE Championship profile

1995 births
Living people
Sinsamut Klinmee
Lightweight kickboxers
Sinsamut Klinmee
Sinsamut Klinmee
ONE Championship kickboxers
Bare-knuckle boxers